{{Infobox animanga/Print
| type        = manga
| author      = Kōichirō Yonemura
| illustrator =
| publisher   = Flex Comix
| demographic = Shōnen
| magazine    = FlexComix Next (2012) Comic Meteor (2012 – 2021)'
| first       = May 8, 2012 
| last        = April 28, 2021
| volumes     = 8
| volume_list = 
}}

 is a three-volume space opera science fiction novel written by Hiroyuki Morioka with cover illustrations by Toshihiro Ono. This was followed by a second, ongoing novel series, Banner of the Stars (a.k.a.

Beginning in 1999, the novels were adapted into anime and manga series, the first of which ran for 13 episodes on WOWOW. A recap movie, Crest of the Stars Special Edition, was also released in 2000.

PlotCrest of the Stars chronicles how Jinto met Lafiel and the events that followed before the war.

When Jinto was a young boy, his world is invaded by the Abh empire. His father who was then president of the Hyde Star System, surrendered the system and earned for himself and his family a nobility within Abh society. Young Jinto is sent off to school in planet Delktou to learn the ways of Abh nobility and the story of Crest of the Stars picks up as he meets the young Abh princess, Lafiel who as a pilot trainee has been assigned to escort him to the patrol ship Gothlauth, a.k.a. Gosroth). Soon, they find themselves unready participants in the incident that would ignite the war between the Abh Empire and the Four Nations Alliance of Humankind — an anti-Abh alliance of the democratic nations of the United Mankind, the Federation of Hania, the Republic of Greater Alcont, and the People's Sovereign Union of Planets.

Characters

Main characters

 Years after his father surrendered the Hyde Star System to the Abh Empire, Jinto is on his way to the capital to attend military school in preparation for claiming his title and succeeding his father as the next territorial lord. He befriends Lafiel not knowing that she is royalty. Although completely unused to life in space, he is quite dependable when on a planet surface.

 Lafiel is the pilot trainee assigned to escort Jinto from the spaceport of Delktou to the patrol ship Gosroth. Although she is a member of the Abriel Imperial Family, she befriends him and allows him to call her by her name. As a space-dweller, she is somehow clueless of life in the surface world. She is self-sacrificing and strong-willed but eventually begins to have more faith in Jinto. She is a very good shot.

Minor characters
 Lexshue Wef-Robell Plakia
 The captain of the patrol ship Gosroth, she decides to send Jinto and Lafiel to Sufugnoff once it is confirmed that the ship is about to be attacked. 

 Atosryua Syun-Atos Lyuf Febdash Klowal
 The third Baron of Febdash, an obscure star system where Jinto and Lafiel made a stopover en route to Sufugnoff (Sfagnaumh). He is ambitious and at the same time embarrassed of his heritage. He tried to detain Lafiel and imprison Jinto, which brought dire consequences onto himself. 

 Atosryua Syun-Atos Lyuf Raika Febdash Srguf
 The second Baron of Febdash and father of Klowal and Loïc. Due to his being a genetic "grounder," his own son despised him resulting in confinement and isolation. He became friends with Jinto and aided Lafiel in "punishing" Klowal.

 Seelnay
 A vassal of the Barony of Febdash who helped Lafiel take over the control room of the baron's mansion. 

 Inspector Entryua
 Chief of the Police Department of Lune Biga, a city on Planet Clasbul in the Sufugnoff Star System. He is forced to cooperate with the invading forces of the United Mankind to search for Jinto and Lafiel. 

 Lt. Kyte
 An Alliance military police officer from the United Mankind who led the search for Jinto and Lafiel in Clasbul. Because he is also genetically engineered, he is despised by most citizens of the United Mankind and is prevented from rising amongst the ranks of the military. This results in deep hatred against the Abh. 

Anti-imperialist group of Clasbul
 Though not necessarily "anti-Abh", it is a group seeking freedom to run their own shipping, transportation, and trade. They help the pair to flee Sufugnoff and escape the clutches of the United Mankind. For their assistance, as well as to meet the legal requirement for ship leasees to be ranking Abh nobles, they are raised to the rank of an Abh dame/equestrian (reucec).

Development
The series is notable for Morioka's creation of an entire language, Baronh, and an accompanying alphabet, Ath, used by the Abh. Almost all written text in the anime is in Baronh, with occasional text in other invented languages; at least one planet is shown to have adopted Ath to write their own language.

Media

Books
Despite being commonly dubbed as a trilogy, the work is actually a three-volume novel. The three volumes were originally released by Hayakawa Publishing from April to June 1996.

The novel volumes were translated and released in English in softcover format by Tokyopop in 2006 and 2007.

On April 20, 2019, J-Novel Club announced they had licensed both Crest of the Stars and Banner of the Stars for digital and physical release. The J-Novel Club version of Crest of the Stars features a new translation. The digital release followed J-Novel Club's model of releasing "prepub" chapters on their website for premium members before the digital retail release on their site and other platforms like Amazon. The physical release for both series is in hardcover omnibus format, with three volumes per issue, with Crest of the Stars released on March 3, 2020.Crest of the Stars I "Princess of the Empire" / "The Imperial Princess" (星界の紋章I 帝国の王女) (Seikai no Monshō I "Teikoku no Ōjo") (Released September 6, 2006 in U.S. by Tokyopop / June 9, 2019 by J-Novel Club (digital))Crest of the Stars II "A Modest War" / "A War Most Modest" (星界の紋章II ささやかな戦い) (Seikai no Monshō II "Sasayaka na Tatakai") (Released January 9, 2007 in U.S. by Tokyopop / August 10, 2019 by J-Novel Club (digital))Crest of the Stars III "Return to a Strange World" / "The Return to Strange Skies" (星界の紋章III 異郷への帰還) (Seikai no Monshō III "Ikyō e no Kikan") (Released May 8, 2007 in U.S. by Tokyopop / October 12, 2019 by J-Novel Club (digital))

AnimeCrest of the Stars was released in Japan in 1999 and in the United States by Bandai in 2001. At the end of 2002, TechTV announced that Crest of the Stars was to be one of the initial titles as part of their new Anime Unleashed programming and began broadcast at the end of 2002 and through 2003. Following the closure of Bandai Entertainment in 2012, Sunrise announced at Otakon 2013, that Funimation had licensed Crest of the Stars, Banner of the Stars I and II and Passage of the Stars. On December 25, 2019, Crest of The Stars and its sequel series Banner of the Stars were released on Blu-ray in Japan.

Radio drama
Radio drama adaptation was broadcast on FM Osaka, and has been released as CDs in three volumes. The cast is practically the same as the anime version, but with some changes.

Manga
Dengeki Comics released a one-volume manga adaptation of the novel on March 27, 2000, after serializing it in Monthly Comic Dengeki Daioh magazine in 1999. The manga was illustrated by Toshihiro Ono and written by Aya Yoshinaga, who has also written the anime adaptation. Hiroyuki Morioka is also credited on the cover as the original creator. 
Much like the anime series, it covers all three volumes. It was licensed by Tokyopop and released on June 8, 2004, under the name Seikai Trilogy, Vol. 1: Crest of the Stars, dubbed the first part of the Seikai Trilogy, since two other companion manga were also released, adapting Banner of the Stars I and II.

The first chapter of a new web manga adaptation of Crest of the Stars by Kōichirō Yonemura was published by Flex Comix in volume five of Nico Nico FlexComix Next digital magazine released on May 8, 2012 and on FlexComix Next site on May 22, 2012; the manga was transferred to Comic Meteor on September 5, 2012. The last chapter was released online on April 28, 2021. The first print volume of the manga went on sale on May 11, 2013 and the eighth and last was released on April 12, 2021. Both were released digitally three days earlier.

Video game
Roughly a year after the anime finished airing, on May 25, 2000 Bandai Visual released a video game adaptation for the PlayStation. It features a story inspired by both the Crest of the Stars and the Banner of the Stars novels, incorporating some of their characters. The game consists of 67 different space battles, with a story split in two paths with three possible endings each.

Reception
In 1996, the world of Japanese science fiction novels was in a slump. Many people considered the genre dead to such an extent that authors avoided it. The appearance of the Crest of the Stars novel was not only a surprise but also earned it the Seiun Award.

References

External links

Crest of the Stars  at the Seikai Web
Funimation page
Bandai Entertainment page

Crest of the Stars (Kōichirō Yonemura's manga) at Comic MeteorReviews
Crest of the Stars – Overview of Crest of the Stars with excerpted scenes by AnimeOnDVD
Crest of the Stars – Review of Crest of the Stars by THEM Anime Reviews
Crest of the Stars – Overview of Crest of the Stars and Banner of the Stars I/II by Animerica''

 
1996 Japanese novels
1999 anime television series debuts
2000 anime films
Bandai Entertainment anime titles
Bandai Namco franchises
Dengeki Comics
Funimation
J-Novel Club books
Japanese animated films
Japanese science fiction novels
Madman Entertainment anime
Military science fiction novels
Novels by Hiroyuki Morioka
Shōnen manga
Space opera anime and manga
Space opera novels
Sunrise (company)
Tokyopop titles
Wowow original programming